Moorrinya is a national park in North Queensland, Australia,  northwest of Brisbane.

See also

 Protected areas of Queensland

References

External links
 

National parks of Queensland
Protected areas established in 1993
North Queensland